James John McArdle (born 3 April 1989) is a Scottish actor from Glasgow. He won the Ian Charleson Award for his role as Mikhail Platonov in Platonov and was nominated for an Laurence Olivier Award for Best Actor in a Supporting Role for portraying Louis Ironson in Angels in America.

Early life
McArdle was born in Glasgow, growing up in the city's Darnley neighbourhood and attending St Ninian's High School, Giffnock. As a child he attended PACE Theatre Company in nearby Paisley. Having worked as a child actor in films, at 17 he made the decision to travel by bus to London to train as a professional without informing his parents; he was accepted to RADA after initially fluffing his audition lines but managing to return and impress the selectors. He left the course towards its end in 2010, and in the same year he appeared in Macbeth at The Globe and starred in the summer smash hit Spur of the Moment by Anya Reiss at the Royal Court Theatre in London. He was also well received in his role in A Month in the Country by Ivan Turgenev at the Chichester Festival Theatre.

Career

In 2011, McArdle played the role of Agathon in Emperor and Galilean by Henrik Ibsen at the National Theatre. He was also Robin Hood in the 2011 RSC production of The Legend, adapted by Ella Hickson.

In 2012, he starred as Harold Abrahams in Chariots of Fire, Mike Bartlett's stage adaptation of the film of the same title, which opened at London's Hampstead Theatre on 9 May and transferred to the West End on 23 June, running through to 5 January 2013.

In 2014, he played King James I of Scotland in Rona Munro's King James I, which was presented at the Edinburgh International Festival and the National Theatre.

In 2016, McArdle won the Ian Charleson Award for his 2015 performance as Platonov in Platonov at the Chichester Festival Theatre

In 2017, McArdle's performance as Louis Ironson in Angels in America at National Theatre Lyttleton in London earned him a nomination for the Olivier Award for Best Actor in a Supporting Role. In March 2018 he stayed with the production when it transferred to Broadway for an 18-week engagement at the Neil Simon Theatre and was nominated for the Drama Desk Award for Outstanding Actor in a Play.

Personal life
He is openly gay and currently resides in London, England.

Filmography

Theatre

Television

Film

Awards and nominations

References

External links
 

Living people
Scottish male stage actors
Alumni of RADA
1989 births
Theatre World Award winners
Ian Charleson Award winners
Male actors from Glasgow
People educated at St Ninian's High School, Giffnock